Marko Mihkelson (born 30 November 1969) is an Estonian politician representing the Reform Party in the Parliament of Estonia.

Mihkelson was born in Valga, and was first elected to the parliament in 2003 as a member of the Pro Patria and Res Publica Union. On 26 June 2017, he and the former leader of the party Margus Tsahkna announced that they were leaving the party. Mihkelson went on to continue as an independent politician, until joining the Reform Party in September 2018.

Photo scandal 

It turns out that already in 2020, Marko Mihkelson has been photographing his partner's children in inappropriate poses, including pictures of naked children and their exposed private parts. The Estonian police did not open a case on this issue at that time. The father of the photographed children, who discovered the pictures, requested that the case be published in the media. The article sparked a debate in the media about whether it was a case of pedophilia or revenge from an ex-husband.

References

1969 births
21st-century Estonian politicians
Estonian Reform Party politicians
Isamaa politicians
Living people
Members of the Riigikogu, 2003–2007
Members of the Riigikogu, 2007–2011
Members of the Riigikogu, 2011–2015
Members of the Riigikogu, 2015–2019
Members of the Riigikogu, 2019–2023
Members of the Riigikogu, 2023–2027
People from Valga, Estonia
Recipients of the Order of the White Star, 4th Class
The Moscow Times